Gerard Alexander Rotherham (28 May 1899 – 31 January 1985) was a first-class cricketer for Cambridge University and Warwickshire in England and for Wellington in New Zealand. His uncle, Hugh Rotherham, played first-class cricket in the 1880s.

Rotherham's chief cricket fame was achieved as a schoolboy at Rugby School, where his record as a fast-medium bowler led to him being named as a Wisden Cricketer of the Year in the 1918 edition of Wisden, at a time when first-class cricket was suspended for the First World War. He then went up to Trinity College, Cambridge.

Rotherham's later first-class career lasted only a few seasons. He got a Blue at Cambridge in both 1919 and 1920, when his swashbuckling lower-order batting was almost as valuable as his increasingly wayward bowling. In 1921, he had a full season of county cricket with Warwickshire, and this time the bowling was more valuable than the batting, and he took 88 wickets in the season. But at the end of the season he moved to New Zealand, where he made just a few appearances for Wellington in 1928–29.

References

External links

English cricketers
People educated at Rugby School
Alumni of Trinity College, Cambridge
Cambridge University cricketers
Warwickshire cricketers
Wellington cricketers
Wisden Cricketers of the Year
1899 births
1985 deaths
Cricketers from Coventry